Ernesto Hartkopf (12 April 1928 – 26 December 2009) was an Argentine equestrian. He competed in the individual jumping event at the 1960 Summer Olympics.

References

External links
 

1928 births
2009 deaths
Argentine male equestrians
Olympic equestrians of Argentina
Equestrians at the 1960 Summer Olympics
Sportspeople from Buenos Aires